The 2017 Players Championship (officially the 2017 Ladbrokes Players Championship) was a professional ranking snooker tournament played between 6–12 March 2017 at the Venue Cymru in Llandudno, Wales. It was the 17th ranking event of the 2016/2017 season.

Prior to this season, this tournament was part of the Players Tour Championship: however, that minor-ranking series was cancelled for this season, and the "Grand Final" event at the end was renamed to be its own ranking event called the Players Championship. It was played between the top 16 players on a one-year ranking list.

Mark Allen was the defending champion, but he did not qualify for this year's tournament.

Judd Trump won the tournament, beating Marco Fu 10–8 in the final.

Prize fund 
The breakdown of prize money is shown below.

The "rolling 147 prize" for a maximum break stood at £25,000.

Seeding list
The seedings were conducted on the basis of the 1-year ranking list up to and including the 2017 Gibraltar Open:

Main draw

Final

Century breaks
Total: 18

 136, 132, 115, 113, 110, 102, 101  Judd Trump
 131, 105  Anthony Hamilton
 123  Neil Robertson
 118, 109, 101  Ronnie O'Sullivan
 115, 107  Ali Carter
 110  Shaun Murphy
 107  Ding Junhui
 106  Marco Fu

References

2017
2017 in Welsh sport
2017 in snooker
2017
2017
March 2017 sports events in the United Kingdom